Saint-Georges-d'Oléron (literally Saint-Georges of Oléron) is a commune on Oléron Island in the Charente-Maritime department, administrative region of Nouvelle-Aquitaine, France.

Population

See also
Boyardville
Fort Boyard
Communes of the Charente-Maritime department

References

Communes of Charente-Maritime
Oléron
Charente-Maritime communes articles needing translation from French Wikipedia
Populated coastal places in France